Friendly (Andrew Kornweibel) is a breaks' producer and DJ. Originally from Australia he is now based in London.

Friendly's debut album, Hello Bellybutton (released on his own Gulp Communications label), was nominated for Best Dance Release at the 1998 ARIA Music Awards.<ref>Rage Who Is Friendly?</ref> The follow-up album, Akimbo debuted at #20 on the Australian albums chart.

Discography
Studio albums

Compilation albums

Extended plays

Singles

Awards
ARIA Music Awards
The ARIA Music Awards is an annual awards ceremony that recognises excellence, innovation, and achievement across all genres of Australian music. They commenced in 1987. Friendly were nominated for four awards.

|-
| 1998
| Hello Bellybutton''
| ARIA Award for Best Dance Release
| 
|-

References

Australian DJs
Living people
Musicians from London
Year of birth missing (living people)